The Eagle Butte mine is a coal mine located  north of Gillette, Wyoming in the United States in the coal-rich Powder River Basin. The mine is an open pit, "truck and shovel", mine producing a low-sulfur, sub-bituminous coal from the Roland and Smith seams that is used for domestic energy generation. Coal produced by the mine is shipped to its customers via railroad. The mine is owned and operated by Blackjewel LLC after being acquired from Contura energy in 2017.

Typical annual production has been in 20-25 million ton range for the last several years though. The average quality of the coal shipped from Eagle Butte is 8,400 BTU/lb, 0.34% Sulfur, 4.50% Ash, and 1.90% Sodium (of the ash). Train loading operations at the mine are done with a batch weigh bin system that is coupled to a "weigh-in-motion" track scale system. Silo capacity at the mine's rail loop, which can accommodate up to 5 unit trains, is 48,000 tons.

History

The Eagle Butte Mine shipped its first train of coal in 1978 after beginning pre-production work in 1976. Eagle Butte mine has changed hands many times through mergers and sales. Previous owners include AMAX, Cyprus AMAX, RAG and Foundation Coal.

In 2005, the Eagle Butte mine was awarded two awards from the Wyoming Department of Environmental Quality for Excellence in Surface Mining Reclamation and Innovation. Eagle Butte was selected to receive these awards because of the superior quality of shrub patches that the mine had established on its reclamation.

On July 1, 2019 CEO Jeffery Hoop announced that Blackjewel LLC, the operator of Eagle Butte had filed for bankruptcy and closed the mine. According to the Casper Star-Tribune, court documents show that Blackjewel owes $500 million in liabilities, including $6 million to employees. This was after Blackjewel was denied $20 million in financing by the United Bank of West Virginia.

Production

References

External links

Mines in Campbell County, Wyoming
Mines in Wyoming
Coal mines in the United States